Business (later – Ukrainian Business Channel, UBC) – first Ukrainian specialized TV channel for business-community. Established in 2007, disestablished in 2017.

History 

 June 27, 2007 – TV channel was licensed.
 September 1, 2007 – began working under the name UBC.
 November 18, 2008 – CEO of TV channel appointed Olexandr Salomakha.
 November 22, 2009 – first program in English.
 2011 – 30% of TV channel bought the Ukrainian Business Group. Fired 40 employees.
 December 26, 2011 – UBC changed its name to Business.
 2017 - channel shut down

Audience 

Main audience – business people. Currently TV channel has an audience of over two million potential viewers of cable and satellite network in the capital and throughout Ukraine.

External links 

 Official site
 On the Radio «Chanson» and channel UBC changed owners

Defunct television stations in Ukraine
Ukrainian-language television stations in Ukraine
Television channels and stations established in 2007
Television channels and stations disestablished in 2017